Vox Balaenae (Voice of the Whale), is a work for electric flute, electric cello and amplified piano by the American avant-garde composer George Crumb. It was composed for performance by the New York Camerata in 1971.

Background
As the name of the piece indicates,  Vox Balaenae  was inspired by whale songs. "Late in the 1960s, George Crumb heard a tape recording prepared by a marine scientist of the sounds emitted by the humpback whale.... In 1971, Crumb drew on these sounds as the inspiration...". Although the piece has eight movements, these are grouped into three structurally similar parts: the first two movements "(...for the beginning of time)", five variations named after geologic time periods, and the last movement "(...for the end of time)".

Movements and instrumentation techniques
In addition to instrumentation techniques, performers are asked to wear half black masks. It is highly suggested that whenever possible the performance be done under blue lighting. The cello is tuned scordatura, and the piece requires the use of a grand piano as the techniques required would not be possible on an upright model.

Recordings

References

1971 compositions
Compositions by George Crumb
Compositions that use extended techniques